Hajji Muhammad Arif Zarif (1942 in Shewaki, Kabul Province, Afghanistan; † November 6, 2007) was a prominent Afghan politician and businessman. He graduated from Afghanistan's military academy. He was the chairman of the Afghanistan Chamber Reform Commission and a member of the Afghan National Parliament, as well as Chairman of the Parliamentary Economics Committee and owner of several private companies. He was a wealthy businessman that owned many properties and enterprises. Arif Zarif was amongst a delegation of politicians and lawmakers killed in the 2007 Baghlan sugar factory bombing, a suicide attack in Baghlan, northern Afghanistan, on November 6, 2007. He was buried in a state ceremony in Kabul three days later.

Hajji Muhammad Arif Zarif was also a nephew of former Afghan parliamentarian Haji Abdul Rasul.

Hajji Muhammad was born in the village of Shewaki which is locacted in the bagrami district which is in the Kabul province.

References

Members of the House of the People (Afghanistan)
Assassinated Afghan politicians
Government ministers of Afghanistan
1942 births
2007 deaths
Terrorism deaths in Afghanistan
Afghan terrorism victims